Marco Borgnino (born 25 October 1997) is an Argentine professional footballer who plays as a left winger for Atlético de Rafaela.

Career
Borgnino started in the youth ranks of Argentine Primera División side Atlético de Rafaela, before making his first-team debut on 3 June 2016 in a Copa Argentina match against Ferro Carril Oeste. Borgnino made his league debut on 28 August against Atlético Tucumán, coming on as a second half substitute in a 1–0 defeat. Two Primera División matches later, he scored his first professional goal in an away win versus Gimnasia y Esgrima. He scored three goals in sixteen league appearances for Rafaela as they were relegated to Primera B Nacional. In July 2017, Borgnino joined top-flight Estudiantes on loan.

He made his Estudiantes debut on 29 August versus Arsenal de Sarandí. Borgnino returned to Rafaela in June 2018, subsequently netting eight times across sixteen games in the 2018–19 Primera B Nacional. On 8 July 2019, Borgnino was loaned to Portuguese outfit Nacional of LigaPro. His first appearance came in a goalless draw against Mafra on 25 August, prior to the winger scoring his one and only goal for Nacional in a win over Penafiel on 21 September. Borgnino returned to Rafaela in June 2020 after five appearances in Portugal. In the succeeding August, Borgnino was loaned to Unión Santa Fe.

Career statistics
.

References

External links
 

1997 births
Living people
People from Rafaela
Argentine footballers
Association football forwards
Argentine expatriate footballers
Expatriate footballers in Portugal
Argentine expatriate sportspeople in Portugal
Argentine Primera División players
Primera Nacional players
Liga Portugal 2 players
Atlético de Rafaela footballers
Estudiantes de La Plata footballers
C.D. Nacional players
Unión de Santa Fe footballers
Argentine people of Italian descent
Sportspeople from Santa Fe Province